Ally Abdukarim Ibrahim Mtoni (13 March 1993 – 11 February 2022), also known as Ally Sonso, was a Tanzanian footballer who played as a defender.

Early life
Mtoni was born at the Muhimbili National Hospital in Dar es Salaam, on 13 March 1993.

Club career
Mtoni has played for Kagera Sugar FC and Lipuli FC, Young Africans SC and Ruvu Shooting FC in Tanzania.

International career
Mtoni made his Tanzania national football team debut on 18 November 2018 in an AFCON 2019 qualifier against Lesotho.

Mtoni was selected for the 2019 Africa Cup of Nations squad.

Personal life
Toni died in Dar es Salaam on 11 February 2022, at the age of 28.

References

External links
 
 

1993 births
2022 deaths
2019 Africa Cup of Nations players
Association football defenders
Kagera Sugar F.C. players
Lipuli F.C. players
People from Dar es Salaam
Ruvu Shooting F.C. players
Tanzania international footballers
Tanzanian footballers
Tanzanian Premier League players
Young Africans S.C. players